Crystal Jade (Chinese: 翡翠餐饮集团), owned by Crystal Jade Culinary Concept Holdings, is a Singapore-based Chinese restaurant chain.

See also
 List of Chinese restaurants

References

The Straits Times, "Clone Wars", 2006-10-15 The print article discussed competition between Crystal Jade and Imperial Treasure as well as reviewed both restaurants.

External links
Official website

Restaurant chains in Singapore
Chinese restaurants outside China
Restaurants established in 1991
1991 establishments in Singapore
Singaporean brands